Epistemological psychology is a multi-sided perspective in psychology uncovering simple primary hidden inklings (images) in ideas, actions, feelings and all social interactions.

The inkling is presumed to trigger an affect which encapsulates and saturates all human experience. In everyday life, inklings induce detection either via human enactments (through habitual behavior) or through spontaneous devotion (conscious expression in the arts).

The term episteme is related to the Greek word επιστήμη, which translates literally as standing near or by that which causes but is often simplified as knowledge or science. By ignoring ego interests the core impetus or the essence of a deed, real or imagined, is recovered.

History
Episteme psychology began with the 1940s written works of Gaston Bachelard, whose many books focused on poetics and (day-) dreaming.  
Ayn rand established the term Pscyho-epistemology near 1965 in which she defined as "Psycho-epistemology is the study of man’s cognitive processes from the aspect of the interaction between the conscious mind and the automatic functions of the subconscious" 
Episteme psychology was established as a separate discipline in the late 1980s through the work of v.d. Stok v. Altenæ.

See also
 Episteme
 Plotius

Further reading
Personal Epistemology: The Psychology of Beliefs About Knowledge and Knowing

References

Branches of psychology
Epistemology of science